Vyninka Arlow (born 25 March 1974) is an Australian former diver who competed in the 1992 Summer Olympics in the 10 meter women's platform where she came 10th. She also competed in the 1996 Summer Olympics. She won a gold medal at the 1998 Commonwealth Games in the 10 metre springboard event.

Vyninka is currently the Elite Pathway Program Coach at the Australian Institute of Sport diving program in Brisbane, Australia.

She is the daughter of Robyn Bradshaw, also a competitive diver.

References

1974 births
Living people
Australian female divers
Olympic divers of Australia
Divers at the 1992 Summer Olympics
Divers at the 1996 Summer Olympics
Commonwealth Games medallists in diving
Commonwealth Games gold medallists for Australia
Divers at the 1998 Commonwealth Games
20th-century Australian women
21st-century Australian women
Medallists at the 1998 Commonwealth Games